Lisa Dwan is an Irish actress, director, and writer. She is best known for her work in theatre, performing in Samuel Beckett adaptations among other works. She began her career in the Fox Kids series Mystic Knights of Tir Na Nog (1998–1999). More recently, she stars in the Netflix series Top Boy (2019–). She also appeared in the RTÉ soap opera Fair City (2006–2007) and the ITV drama Rock Rivals (2008).

Early life
Dwan was born in Coosan, Athlone, County Westmeath, Ireland, and originally trained as a ballet dancer. She was chosen to dance with Rudolf Nureyev in the Ballet San Jose's production of "Coppélia" in Dublin when she was 12 years old. She left school at 14 after winning a scholarship to attend the Dorothy Stevens School of Ballet in Leeds, and also danced with the London Lewis Ballet Company. Dwan began acting professionally as a teenager.

Career
Dwan's first movie was playing the role of Agnes in an adaptation of Oliver Twist, co-starring Elijah Wood and Richard Dreyfuss.

Dwan's first regular series role was as Princess Deirdre, the Mystic Knight of Air, on Saban's Mystic Knights of Tir Na Nog. She played the role of Orla in eight episodes of RTÉ's "The Big Bow Wow" in 2004, the role of Zoe Burke in 28 episodes of the Irish soap opera Fair City from 2006 to 2007, and the role of Angel Islington on Rock Rivals.

In January 2009 she starred opposite Martin Sheen as "Marika" in Bhopal: Prayer for Rain.

Dwan is most well known internationally for her performances and adaptations of Samuel Beckett's works; Kate Kellaway has called her an "Irish actor and Beckett interpreter of the first rank". She performed in Beckett's Not I in London's Battersea Arts Centre in 2005, and was interviewed with Billie Whitelaw, whom Beckett called the "perfect actress", as part of the Beckett celebrations on BBC Radio 3.
Beginning in 2006, Whitelaw mentored Dwan on her work on Beckett. Dwan performed the piece again in July 2009 at the Southbank Centre in London in a time of nine minutes and fifty seconds, and again at the International Beckett Festival in 2012. The event was repeated at Reading University in May 2013.
 Beginning in 2013, Dwan toured with "The Beckett Trilogy", consisting of Not I alongside two of Beckett's other short plays, Footfalls and Rockaby, under the direction of Walter Asmus at the Royal Court Theatre, West End, The Barbican Centre, and the Brooklyn Academy of Music, and performed sold-out shows at various international locations. In a review of her performance at the Brooklyn Academy of Music, Ben Brantley wrote that Dwan "is an instrument of Beckett, in that way saints and martyrs are said to be instruments of God".

In October 2016, Dwan adapted and starred in No's Knife, a one-woman production adapted from Beckett's Stories and Texts for Nothing at London's Old Vic and Abbey Theatre Dublin. Dwan is the first woman to perform Beckett's Stories and Texts for Nothing.

In 2017, Dwan starred in Harold Pinter's "The Lover" and "The Collection" at the Shakespeare Theatre Company in Washington, D.C., for which she won Shakespeare Theatre Company's Emery Battis Award for Acting Excellence. In 2016, Dwan starred in Marina Carr's stage adaptation of Anna Karenina for the Abbey Theatre in Dublin. Other recent theatre appearances include Shining City off-Broadway and at the Irish Repertory Theatre in 2016, Beside the Sea at the Southbank Centre in London in 2012, Margot, Diary of an Unhappy Queen in at the Barbican Centre in London in 2012, The Journey Between Us at Southbank Theatre in London in 2016, Illusions by Ivan Viripaev at the Bush Theatre in London, The Soldier's Tale at the Hay Festival in 2013, The Importance of Being Earnest on tour in Ireland in 1999, and The History of the World at 3am at Andrews Lane Theatre in Dublin in 1996, among others.

In 2021, Dwan played Tori Matthews opposite James Nesbitt in Bloodlands, an acclaimed four-part BBC drama.

Dwan regularly writes, lectures, and teaches on theatre, gender, and Beckett. Recent speaking engagements include appearances on BBC radio and television and WNYC. Dwan also writes about Beckett and the arts, including an in The Guardian. She has lectured at the École Normale Supérieure, University of Reading and the University of Oxford, and recently completed a residency at Princeton University's Lewis Center for the Arts, where she taught a class on adapting Beckett's prose work. Dwan was also a 2017–2018 artist in residence at Columbia University, where she worked with Irish writer Colm Toibin on Pale Sister, a play derived from the class they taught called "The Antigone Project". Dwan was a resident fellow at the School of Art and Ballet at New York University from 2017 to 2018.

Dwan is an artist in residence at MIT.

Filmography

Film

Television

References

External links
 
 
 Lisa Dwan on the Lewis Center for the Arts
 Lisa Dwan on the Festival of Writing and Ideas

20th-century Irish actresses
21st-century Irish actresses
Irish expatriates in the United Kingdom
Irish stage actresses
Irish television actresses
Living people
People from Athlone
Year of birth missing (living people)